Abercwmboi Rugby Football Club is a Welsh Rugby Union club based in the Cynon Valley in South Wales. Abercwmboi RFC play in the Welsh Rugby Union Division Two East Central and is a feeder club for the Cardiff Blues.

Notable players
 Ian Evans
 Dafydd Lockyer

References

External links
Abercwmboi RFC Official website

Rugby clubs established in 1980
1980 establishments in Wales
Welsh rugby union teams
Sport in Aberdare